Alt-Tegel is a Berlin U-Bahn station located on the .
It was constructed by B. Grimmek and opened as "Tegel" station in 1958.  In 1992, the station was renamed to Alt-Tegel (Old Tegel).  Nearby, indeed nearly 600 meters to walk, is the S-Bahn station Berlin-Tegel, and the rename perhaps occurred to avoid confusion.

As it is the end of the U6, it has eight exits, and is an important feeder for people who want to go to the Tegeler See, a recreation site in Berlin.

History 
Even though line U6 had only opened in 1923, by the 1930s there were already plans by the city of Berlin to extend the U6 to Wedding, even to Tegel. Construction work for an extension began in 1929 on the Müllerstraße. Due to the imminent global economic crisis and the resulting financial consequences for the city of Berlin, this had the work stopped. The result was a roughly 400-meter-long tunnel.

After the Second World War, the BVG planned a massive expansion of the Berlin U-Bahn. In the first stage, line C (U6), which then ended at Grenzallee and Seestraße. Construction began for the extension to Tegel on 26 October 1953. The extension was to be realized in two stages. First, the section Seestraße - Kurt-Schumacher-Platz, followed by the part above ground section Kurt-Schumacher-Platz - Borsigwerke then underground to Alt-Tegel. The second section included the stations Scharnweberstraße (above ground), Seidelstraße (now: Otisstraße, aboveground), Holzhauser Straße (above ground), Borsigwerke (underground) and terminus Tegel, which was also underground.

In 1995, when the S-Bahn line to Henningsdorf was reopened, to avoid confusion with the S-Bahn station Tegel the U-Bahn station was renamed Alt-Tegel.

References 

https://de.wikipedia.org/wiki/U-Bahnhof_Alt-Tegel

U6 (Berlin U-Bahn) stations
Buildings and structures in Reinickendorf
Railway stations in Germany opened in 1958